Dick Klawitter (June 29, 1929 – December 11, 1977) was an American football center. He played for the Chicago Bears in 1956.

References

1929 births
1977 deaths
American football centers
South Dakota State Jackrabbits football players
Chicago Bears players
Players of American football from Chicago